Saffar is a surname. Notable people with the name include:
Ammar al-Saffar, Deputy Health Minister of Iraq
Hassan al-Saffar (born 1958), Shi'a scholar from Qatif, Saudi Arabia
Hossein Saffar Harandi (born 1953), Minister of Culture and Islamic Guidance of Iran until 26 July 2009
Jamal Al-Saffar (born 1971), Saudi Arabian sprinter who specialized in the 100 metres
Saeed-Al-Saffar (born 1968), cricketer who has represented the UAE at international level
Yoav Saffar (born 1975), Israeli basketball player

See also
 Safar (disambiguation)
 Saffar (planet) or Upsilon Andromedae b, an exoplanet

Marj al-Saffar or Marj al-Suffar, a large plain to the south of Damascus. Because of its good water supply and excellent grazing Marj al-Saffar was a staging area for armies and an area in which many battles was fought. For a list of battles see Battle of Marj al-Saffar.